The Jeonju KCC Egis is a professional basketball club in the Korean Basketball League.

Current roster

Honours

Domestic

Korean Basketball League
KBL Championship
 Winners (5): 1997–98, 1998–99, 2003–04, 2008–09, 2010–11
 Runners-up (5): 1999–2000, 2004–05, 2009–10, 2015–16, 2020–21

KBL Regular Season
 Winners (5): 1997–98, 1998–99, 1999–2000, 2015–16, 2020–21
 Runners-up (3): 2003–04, 2004–05, 2007–08
 Third place (5): 2001–02, 2008–09, 2009–10, 2010–11, 2017–18

International invitationals
Merlion Cup
 Third place: 2017

External links

 Official website

 
Basketball teams in South Korea
Basketball teams established in 1977
Korean Basketball League teams
Sport in Daejeon
Sport in Jeonju
1977 establishments in South Korea